Hollisterville (also Hallisterville) is an unincorporated community in Wayne County, Pennsylvania, United States.

Notable person

Lewis Steward (1824-1896), Illinois politician and businessman, was born near Hollisterville.

Notes

Unincorporated communities in Wayne County, Pennsylvania
Unincorporated communities in Pennsylvania